Devil of the Desert Against the Son of Hercules is a 1964 international co-production filmed in Algeria and directed by Anthony Dawson.

Plot summary 
An evil and ambitious usurper named Ganor seizes a kingdom by assassinating the Sultan and imprisoning his son Prince Daikor and daughter Princess Soraya to prevent revolt.  Princess Soraya is defiant and escapes by leaping out the palace window into a river.  She is discovered by a pair of peasants Anthar and the mute Aimu who become her protectors, and later rescuers and avengers against Ganor.

The film concludes in a showdown in a hall of mirrors.

Cast 
Kirk Morris as  Anthar
Michèle Girardon as Princess Soraya
Renato Baldini as Kamal
Mario Feliciani as Ganor
José Jaspe as Akrim
Manuel Gallardo as Prince Daikor
Nadine Verdier as Slave Girl

Release
Devil of the Desert Against the Son of Hercules was released on June 27, 1964 in Italy. 
The film grossed 140,300,000 Italian lire at domestically in Italy.

The film was originally titled Anthar the invincible but was retitled The Devil of the Desert Against the Son of Hercules for inclusion on Avco Embassy's The Sons of Hercules syndicated television series. The series was 14 peplum that were retitled and re-edited to be distributed under the title of The Sons of Hercules.

See also 
 List of Italian films of 1964

References

Footnotes

Sources

External links 

1964 films
1960s fantasy adventure films
1960s Italian-language films
Films directed by Antonio Margheriti
Peplum films
Films shot in Algeria
Films set in the Middle Ages
Films set in the Middle East
Sword and sandal films
1960s Italian films